Arsia may signify:
Raša River, in Croatian Istria
Arsia Mons, a volcano on Mars.
Silva Arsia, a forest near Republican Rome.